Jaroslav Kvapil (21 April 1892, in Fryšták – 18 February 1958, in Brno) was a Czech composer, teacher, conductor and pianist.

Life and career
Born in Fryšták, he studied with Josef Nešvera and worked as a chorister in Olomouc from 1902 to 1906. He then studied at the Brno School of Organists under Leoš Janáček, earning a diploma in 1909. He studied with Max Reger at the Leipzig Conservatory from 1911 through 1913.

Kvapil was an excellent accompanist, noted for his skill in sight reading. As the choirmaster and conductor of the Brno Beseda (1919–47) he gave the world première of Janáček's Glagolitic Mass, and the Czech premières of Johann Sebastian Bach’s St Matthew Passion (1923), Arthur Honegger’s Judith (1933) and Karol Szymanowski’s Stabat mater (1937). He received the Award of Merit in 1955. He taught at the School of Organists and at the Brno Conservatory, and he was appointed professor of composition at the academy in 1947. His students included Hana Janků, Miloslav Ištvan, Ctirad Kohoutek, Čestmír Gregor and Jiří Matys. He died in Brno at the age of 65.

Selected works
Orchestra
 Dnes a zítra (Today and Tomorrow), Symphonic Overture
 Notturno (1911)
 Symphony No.2
 Symphony No.4
 Svítání (Dawn), Symphonic Poem
 Thema con variazioni e fuga
 Z těžkých dob (From Hard Times), Symphonic Variations

Concertante
 Concerto for oboe and orchestra
 Concerto for piano and orchestra
 Concerto No.1 for violin and orchestra (1927–1928)
 Concerto No.2 for violin and orchestra (1952)
 Suita (Suite) for viola and chamber orchestra (1955)

Chamber music
 Clarinet Quintet (1914)
 Dvě skladby (2 Pieces) for violin and piano (1946)
 Quartet for flute, violin, viola and cello (1948)
 String Quartet No.4 (1935)
 Duo for violin and viola (1949)
 String Quartet No.5 (1949)
 Sonata in D major for violin and piano (1950)
 Sonata in D major for violin and piano
 Sonata for violin and organ
 Variace na vlastní thema (Variations on an Original Theme) for trumpet and piano (1929)

Organ
 Fantasie in E minor

Piano
 Legenda (1912)
 Menuetto (1912)
 Intermezzo (1912)
 Humoreska (1912)
 Lento melancolico – Allegro risoluto
 Sonata (1910)
 Sonatina (1950)
 Údolím stesku a žalu, 9 Pieces (1936)
 Vánoce (Christmas) (1924)
 Variace na vlastní thema (Variations on an Original Theme) (1914)
 V říši snů (In the Realm of Dreams) (1933)

Vocal
 Pět písní na slova Antonína Sovy (5 Songs on the Words of Antonín Sova) (1918)

Choral
 Dukelská dumka, Song for unison chorus

Notes

External links

References
Jan Trojan. "Kvapil, Jaroslav", Grove Dictionary of Music and Musicians.

1892 births
1958 deaths
Czech composers
Czech male composers
Czech choral conductors
Czech pianists
20th-century conductors (music)
20th-century composers
20th-century pianists
Male pianists
20th-century Czech male musicians
People from Fryšták
Burials at Brno Central Cemetery
Academic staff of Brno Conservatory